General Mohamed Adam Ahmed (born 1950) was the Chief Staff of Somali Armed Forces. He took charge on 24 September 2015 after a major reshuffle in Somali force leaders including police. He served until April 2017, where he was replaced when President Mohamed Abdullahi Mohamed make a shakeup.

He is one of the long serving Somali military generals. He studied at different military colleges including Military Academy (Cairo, Egypt), Command and General Staff College (at the Frunze Military Academy, Moscow, Soviet Union) and U.S. Army War College Strategy Studies.

References

1950 births
Living people
Somalian generals
United States Army War College alumni